HMIS Sutlej (U95) was a modified Bittern-class sloop, later known as the Black Swan class, which served in the Royal Indian Navy (RIN) during World War II.

After India became a republic on 26 January 1950, the vessel was renamed as the Indian Navy's INS Sutlej.

History
HMIS Sutlej was ordered on 8 September 1939 under the 1939 Programme for the Royal Indian Navy. She was built by William Denny and Brothers and commissioned on 23 April 1941.

With World War II underway at the time, she was immediately deployed for convoy defence in the Irish Sea. When the convoy was split into fast and slow vessels, she and Totland escorted the slow section to Freetown.

Mid-way, in September, she received orders to join the British Mediterranean Fleet and proceeded to the Suez, where she was deployed for anti-aircraft defence.

After Japan entered the war, she was transferred to the East Indies in December 1941. She was then deployed to escort military convoys to Singapore, in the Bay of Bengal, on the West coast of India, as well as to the Persian Gulf and Aden all through 1942 and early 1943.

In May 1943, she joined the Mediterranean Fleet again in Alexandria, where she continued on escort duty. In July, she was part of the amphibious task force for Operation Husky, the Allied invasion of Sicily. In September, she supported military operations during the defence of the Aegean Islands.

In December 1943, she was transferred back to the Eastern Fleet and deployed for convoy escort in the Arabian Sea and the Bay of Bengal. In June 1944, she was deployed for anti-submarine operations in the Indian Ocean.

After a refit in Bombay, she was deployed back in the Bay of Bengal, and supported amphibious assaults in Burma and Malaya. She was part of the task force during Operation Dracula for the amphibious assault on Rangoon by the British Indian Army and the British Army.

The task force then continued on a mission to intercept Japanese troops withdrawing from the Andamans. At the end of the war, she was on refit in Bombay.

After Indian Independence, she was commissioned into the Indian Navy as INS Sutlej and reclassified as a frigate. In 1955, she was converted into a survey ship. She was decommissioned in 1978, and sold for scrap in 1979. She was scrapped in 1980.

Notes

References
 

Black Swan-class sloops of the Royal Indian Navy
Black Swan-class sloops of the Indian Navy
1940 ships